Terahertz spectroscopy detects and controls properties of matter with electromagnetic fields that are in the frequency range between a few hundred gigahertz and several terahertz (abbreviated as THz). In many-body systems, several of the relevant states have an energy difference that matches with the energy of a THz photon. Therefore, THz spectroscopy provides a particularly powerful method in resolving and controlling individual transitions between different many-body states. By doing this, one gains new insights about many-body quantum kinetics and how that can be utilized in developing new technologies that are optimized up to the elementary quantum level.

Different electronic excitations within semiconductors are already widely used in lasers, electronic components and computers. At the same time, they constitute an interesting many-body system whose quantum properties can be modified, e.g., via a nanostructure design. Consequently, THz spectroscopy on semiconductors is relevant in revealing both new technological potentials of nanostructures as well as in exploring the fundamental properties of many-body systems in a controlled fashion.

Background

There are a great variety of techniques to generate THz radiation and to detect THz fields. One can, e.g., use an antenna, a quantum-cascade laser, a free-electron laser, or optical rectification to produce well-defined THz sources. The resulting THz field can be characterized via its electric field ETHz(t). Present-day experiments can already output ETHz(t) that has a peak value in the range of MV/cm (megavolts per centimeter). To estimate how strong such fields are, one can compute the level of energy change such fields induce to an electron over microscopic distance of one nanometer (nm), i.e., L = 1 nm. One simply multiplies the peak ETHz(t) with elementary charge e and L to obtain e ETHz(t) L = 100 meV. In other words, such fields have a major effect on electronic systems because the mere field strength of ETHz(t) can induce electronic transitions over microscopic scales. One possibility is to use such THz fields to study Bloch oscillations where semiconductor electrons move through the Brillouin zone, just to return to where they started,  giving rise to the Bloch oscillations.

The THz sources can be also extremely short, down to single cycle of THz field's oscillation. For one THz, that means duration in the range of one picosecond (ps). Consequently, one can use THz fields to monitor and control ultrafast processes in semiconductors or to produce ultrafast switching in semiconductor components. Obviously, the combination of ultrafast duration and strong peak ETHz(t) provides vast new possibilities to systematic studies in semiconductors. 

Besides the strength and duration of ETHz(t), the THz field's photon energy plays a vital role in semiconductor investigations because it can be made resonant with several intriguing many-body transitions. For example, electrons in conduction band and holes, i.e., electronic vacancies, in valence band attract each other via the Coulomb interaction. Under suitable conditions, electrons and holes can be bound to excitons that are hydrogen-like states of matter. At the same time, the exciton binding energy is few to hundreds of meV that can be matched energetically with a THz photon. Therefore, the presence of excitons can be uniquely detected based on the absorption spectrum of a weak THz field. Also simple states, such as plasma and correlated electron–hole plasma can be monitored or modified by THz fields.

Terahertz time-domain spectroscopy

In optical spectroscopy, the detectors typically measure the intensity of the light field rather than the electric field because there are no detectors that can directly measure electromagnetic fields in the optical range. However, there are multiple techniques, such as antennas and  electro-optical sampling, that can be applied to measure the time evolution of ETHz(t) directly. For example, one can propagate a THz pulse through a semiconductor sample and measure the transmitted and reflected fields as function of time. Therefore, one collects information of semiconductor excitation dynamics completely in time domain, which is the general principle of the terahertz time-domain spectroscopy.

By using short THz pulses,  a great variety of physical phenomena have already been studied. For unexcited, intrinsic semiconductors one can determine the complex permittivity or THz-absorption coefficient and refractive index, respectively. The frequency of transversal-optical phonons, to which THz photons can couple, lies for most semiconductors at several THz. Free carriers in doped semiconductors or optically excited semiconductors lead to a considerable absorption of THz photons. Since THz pulses passes through non-metallic materials, they can be used for inspection and transmission of packaged items.

Terahertz-induced plasma and exciton transitions

The THz fields can be applied to accelerate electrons out of their equilibrium. If this is done fast enough, one can measure the elementary processes, such as how fast the screening of the Coulomb interaction is built up. This was experimentally explored in Ref. where it was shown that screening is complete within tens of femtoseconds in semiconductors. These insights are very important to understand how electronic plasma behaves in solids.

The Coulomb interaction can also pair electrons and holes into excitons, as discussed above. Due to their analog to the hydrogen atom, excitons have  bound states that can be uniquely identified by the usual quantum numbers 1s, 2s, 2p, and so on. In particular, 1s-to-2p transition is dipole allowed and can be directly generated by ETHz(t) if the photon energy matches the transition energy. In gallium arsenide-type systems, this transition energy is roughly 4 meV that corresponds to 1 THz photons. At resonance, the dipole d1s,2p defines the Rabi energy ΩRabi = d1s,2p ETHz(t) that determines the time scale at which the 1s-to-2p transition proceeds.

For example, one can excite the excitonic transition with an additional optical pulse which is synchronized with the THz pulse. This technique is called transient THz spectroscopy. Using this technique one can follow the formation dynamics of excitons or observe THz gain arising from intraexcitonic transitions.

Since a THz pulse can be intense and short, e.g., single-cycle, it is experimentally possible to realize situations where duration of the pulse, time scale related to Rabi- as well as the THz photon energy ħω are degenerate. In this situation, one enters the realm of extreme nonlinear optics where the usual approximations, such as the rotating-wave approximation (abbreviated as RWA) or the conditions for complete state transfer, break down. As a result, the Rabi oscillations become strongly distorted by the non-RWA contributions, the multiphoton absorption or emission processes, and the dynamic Franz–Keldysh effect, as measured in Refs.

By using a free-electron laser, one can generate longer THz pulses that are more suitable for detecting the Rabi oscillations directly.  This technique could indeed demonstrate the Rabi oscillations, or actually the related Autler–Townes splitting, in experiments. The Rabi splitting has also been measured with a short THz pulse and also the onset to multi-THz-photon ionization has been detected, as the THz fields are made stronger. Recently, it has also been shown that the Coulomb interaction causes nominally dipole-forbidden intra-excitonic transitions to become partially allowed.

Theory of terahertz transitions

Terahertz transitions in solids can be systematically approached by generalizing the semiconductor Bloch equations and the related many-body correlation dynamics. At this level, one realizes the THz field are directly absorbed by two-particle correlations that modify the quantum kinetics of electron and hole distributions. Therefore, a systematic THz analysis must include the quantum kinetics of many-body correlations, that can be treated systematically, e.g., with the cluster-expansion approach. At this level, one can explain and predict a wide range of effects with the same theory, ranging from Drude-like response of plasma to extreme nonlinear effects of excitons.

See also
 Terahertz nondestructive evaluation
 Terahertz time-domain spectroscopy
 Terahertz radiation
 Ultrafast laser spectroscopy
 Semiconductor Bloch equations
 Cluster-expansion approach
 Elliott formula

References

Spectroscopy
Terahertz technology